The  2018 United States Open Championship was the 118th U.S. Open, held  at Shinnecock Hills Golf Club in Shinnecock Hills, New York, about  east of New York City on Long Island; it was the fifth time the U.S. Open was held at this course.

Defending champion Brooks Koepka shot a final round 68 for 281 (+1) to win his second straight U.S. Open, one stroke ahead of runner-up Tommy Fleetwood, who closed with the sixth round of 63 in U.S. Open history. Koepka was only the third to successfully defend the title since World War II, following Ben Hogan (1951) and Curtis Strange (1989).

The USGA changed the playoff format in February, from a full round (18 holes) to a two-hole aggregate playoff. Previously, playoffs at the U.S. Open were 18 holes, followed by sudden-death, if needed. The last 18-hole playoff was in 2008, won by Tiger Woods on the first sudden-death hole.

Venue

Course layout

Lengths of the course for previous major championships:
, par 70 - 2004 U.S. Open
, par 70 - 1995 U.S. Open
, par 70 - 1986 U.S. Open
,  - 1896 U.S. Open

2018 yardages by round

 Scoring average: 74.650
 by round: 76.474, 73.595, 75.327, 72.180
 Most difficult holes in relation to par: 14, 3, 2, 10

Source:

Field

About half the field consisted of players who were exempt from qualifying for the U.S. Open. Each player is classified according to the first category in which he qualified, and other categories are shown in parentheses.

1. Winners of the U.S. Open Championship during the last ten years
Lucas Glover, Dustin Johnson (12,13,14), Martin Kaymer, Brooks Koepka (11,12,13,14), Graeme McDowell, Rory McIlroy (6,7,13,14), Justin Rose (12,13,14), Webb Simpson (8,12,13,14), Jordan Spieth (5,6,12,13,14), Tiger Woods

2. Winner and runner-up of the 2017 U.S. Amateur, winner of the 2017 U.S. Junior Amateur and 2017 U.S. Mid-Amateur
Doug Ghim (a), Noah Goodwin (a), Matt Parziale (a)

Doc Redman forfeited his exemption as winner of the U.S. Amateur by turning professional in May 2018.

3. Winner of the 2017 Amateur Championship
Harry Ellis (a)

4. Winner of the 2017 Mark H. McCormack Medal (men's World Amateur Golf Ranking)
Joaquín Niemann forfeited his exemption by turning professional.

5. Winners of the Masters Tournament during the last five years
Sergio García (12,13,14), Patrick Reed (12,13,14), Bubba Watson (13,14), Danny Willett

6. Winners of The Open Championship during the last five years
Zach Johnson (13,14), Phil Mickelson (13,14), Henrik Stenson (13,14)

7. Winners of the PGA Championship during the last five years
Jason Day (8,12,13,14), Jason Dufner (12,13,14), Justin Thomas (11,12,13,14), Jimmy Walker (13,14)

8. Winners of The Players Championship during the last three years
Kim Si-woo (13,14)

9. Winner of the 2018 European Tour BMW PGA Championship
Francesco Molinari (13,14)

10. Winner of the 2017 U.S. Senior Open Championship
Kenny Perry

11. The 10 lowest scorers and anyone tying for 10th place at the 2017 U.S. Open Championship
Tommy Fleetwood (13,14), Rickie Fowler (12,13,14), Bill Haas, Brian Harman (12,13,14), Charley Hoffman (12,13,14), Hideki Matsuyama (12,13,14), Trey Mullinax, Xander Schauffele (12,13,14), Brandt Snedeker

12. Players who qualified for the season-ending 2017 Tour Championship
Daniel Berger (13,14), Patrick Cantlay (13,14), Paul Casey (13,14), Kevin Chappell (13,14), Tony Finau (13,14), Adam Hadwin (13,14), Russell Henley (13,14), Kevin Kisner (13,14), Matt Kuchar (13,14), Marc Leishman (13,14), Pat Perez (13,14), Jon Rahm (13,14), Kyle Stanley (13,14), Jhonattan Vegas, Gary Woodland (13,14)

13. The top 60 point leaders and ties as of May 21, 2018, in the Official World Golf Ranking
Kiradech Aphibarnrat (14), Rafa Cabrera-Bello (14), Bryson DeChambeau (14), Ross Fisher (14), Matt Fitzpatrick (14), Dylan Frittelli, Branden Grace (14), Chesson Hadley, Tyrrell Hatton (14), Charles Howell III (14), Satoshi Kodaira (14), Alexander Lévy (14), Li Haotong (14), Luke List (14), Alex Norén (14), Louis Oosthuizen (14), Ian Poulter (14), Chez Reavie (14), Charl Schwartzel (14), Cameron Smith (14), Brendan Steele (14), Peter Uihlein (14)

14. The top 60 point leaders and ties as of June 11, 2018, in the Official World Golf Ranking
An Byeong-hun, Emiliano Grillo

15. Special exemptions given by the USGA
Ernie Els, Jim Furyk

The remaining contestants earned their places through sectional qualifiers. 
 Japan: Shota Akiyoshi, David Bransdon, Liang Wenchong
 England: Dean Burmester, Ryan Fox, Scott Gregory, Andrew Johnston, Tom Lewis, James Morrison, Thorbjørn Olesen, Matthieu Pavon, Richie Ramsay, Kristoffer Reitan (a), Jason Scrivener, Matthew Southgate, Matt Wallace, Paul Waring
 United States
 Daly City, California: Shintaro Ban (a), Franklin Huang (a,L), Park Sung-joon, Rhett Rasmussen (a,L), Yu Chun-an (a)
 Jupiter, Florida: Luis Gagne (a,L), Tyler Strafaci (a,L), Richy Werenski
 Roswell, Georgia: Roberto Castro, Michael Hebert (L), Garrett Rank (a,L)
 Rockville, Maryland: Mickey DeMorat (L), Cole Miller (L), Sebastián Muñoz, Tim Wilkinson
 Summit, New Jersey: Stewart Hagestad (a), Calum Hill, Theo Humphrey (a), Michael Miller (L), Cameron Wilson
 Columbus, Ohio: Aaron Baddeley, Keegan Bradley, Brian Gay, Im Sung-jae, Russell Knox, Shane Lowry, Ryan Lumsden (a,L), Michael Putnam, Patrick Rodgers, Ollie Schniederjans, Adam Scott, Shubhankar Sharma, Harold Varner III, Will Zalatoris
 Springfield, Ohio: David Gazzolo (L), Will Grimmer (a,L), Dylan Meyer (L), Brian Stuard, Timothy Wiseman (a,L)
 Portland, Oregon: Chris Babcock (L), Michael Block (L), Lucas Herbert, Sulman Raza (L)
 Memphis, Tennessee: Eric Axley, Sam Burns, Tyler Duncan, Lanto Griffin, Mackenzie Hughes, Matt Jones, Scott Stallings, Steve Stricker, Braden Thornberry (a), Sebastián Vázquez (L), Aaron Wise
 Richmond, Texas: Philip Barbaree (a), Jacob Bergeron (a), Chris Naegel (L)

Alternates who gained entry:
Ryan Evans (England) – claimed spot held for category 14
Rikuya Hoshino (Japan) – claimed spot held for category 14
Scott Piercy (Memphis) – claimed spot held for category 14
Ted Potter Jr. (Columbus) – claimed spot held for category 14

(a) denotes amateur
(L) denotes player advanced through local qualifying

Nationalities in the field

^ Amateur Luis Gagne is a dual-citizen of Costa Rica and the United States. The U.S. Open lists him as representing Costa Rica (as in this table) while the World Amateur Golf Ranking lists him as representing the United States.

Round summaries

First round
Thursday, June 14, 2018

Conditions were extremely difficult as gusty winds hung around all day with sunny skies, making the course firm and fast. Only four players broke par, including Dustin Johnson, one of the tournament favorites. The scoring average for the round was 76.47.

Second round
Friday, June 15, 2018

Dustin Johnson held the lead after shooting a 67, four shots ahead of Charley Hoffman and Scott Piercy.	

Amateurs: Grimmer (+5), Gagne (+7), Parziale (+7), Thornberry (+9), Strafaci (+10), Ghim (+13), Rasmussen (+14), Hagestad (+15), Bergeron (+16), Humphrey (+16), Yu (+17), Huang (+18), Lumsden (+18), Rank (+18), Reitan (+18), Wiseman (+18), Ban (+19), Ellis (+19), Goodwin (+19), Barbaree (+21)

Third round
Saturday, June 16, 2018

Second round leader Dustin Johnson shot a seven-over 77 to fall into a four-way tie with Daniel Berger, Tony Finau and defending champion Brooks Koepka. Johnson double bogeyed the par-3 2nd and went six-over on the front-nine. He made his only birdie of the round at the 11th to get back to the top of the leaderboard, but three-putted for bogey on 18 to settle for a share of the 54-hole lead. Berger and Finau began the round in 45th place and 11 shots behind, but each shot 66 (−4) for the low round of the day.	

Scoring conditions got more difficult as the day went on. Koepka's two-over 72 was the lowest score among the final four groups. Only three rounds in the 60s were recorded, two of them by Berger and Finau. The scoring average for the round was 75.3.

Phil Mickelson incurred a two-shot penalty on the 13th when he walked after his ball which was running slowly away from the hole after his putt and deliberately hit the ball backwards towards the hole while it was still moving. He ended up shooting 81 (+11), equalling his highest score at the U.S. Open.	

Amateurs: Parziale (+11), Gagne (+12), Grimmer (+13)

Final round
Sunday, June 17, 2018

Summary
Brooks Koepka shot a final round 68 (−2) to finish one ahead of Tommy Fleetwood and win the U.S. Open for the second straight year.  He was the first to successfully defend the title in 29 years, since Curtis Strange in 1989.

Koepka began the round in a four-way tie for the lead with Dustin Johnson, Daniel Berger, and Tony Finau. He got off to a good start with birdies on three of his first five holes to get to even par and take the lead. At the par-3 11th, his tee shot went into the rough over the green. After chipping into a greenside bunker, he holed a  putt to save bogey. At the following hole, he made a six-foot par putt, then at the 14th he got up-and-down to save par from short of the green with an eight-foot putt. Hitting his approach at the par-5 16th to within four feet, he made the birdie to open up a two-shot lead. Despite a bogey at the 18th, Koepka held on win by one.

Fleetwood shot the sixth round of 63 in U.S. Open history to finish in second. Fleetwood had an eight-foot putt at the 18th for the first 62 in U.S. Open history, but it slid past the hole that would have forced the first two-hole playoff.

Johnson made birdie at the 5th but three-putted for bogey at the 7th, 11th, 14th, and 17th. He birdied the last to shoot an even-par 70 and finish two shots behind Koepka. Finau bogeyed three of his first four holes but got back to even for the round with a 26-foot birdie at the 11th. He came to the 18th two back of Koepka but made double bogey and ended up in fifth place, four behind. Berger also started his round with two bogeys and finished with a three-over 73 to tie for sixth. Patrick Reed began three shots behind but birdied his first three holes and five of the first seven to tie for the lead. He made four bogeys the rest of the round, however, to fall back to fourth place.	

With the win, Koepka becomes the seventh player to win consecutive U.S. Opens, and the first since Curtis Strange in 1989.

Final leaderboard

Scorecard
Final round

Cumulative tournament scores, relative to par
{|class="wikitable" span = 50 style="font-size:85%;
|-
|  style="background:Pink; width:10px;"|
|Birdie
|  style="background:PaleGreen; width:10px;"|
|Bogey
|    style="background:Green; width:10px;"|
|Double bogey
|}

Media
This was the fourth U.S. Open televised by Fox and FS1.

References

External links

United States Golf Association
Coverage on the PGA Tour's official site
 Coverage on the European Tour's official site
Coverage on the PGA of America's official site

U.S. Open (golf)
U.S. Open (golf)
U.S. Open
U.S. Open (golf)
U.S. Open (golf)
U.S. Open (golf)